Background music (British English: piped music) is a mode of musical performance in which the music is not intended to be a primary focus of potential listeners, but its content, character, and volume level are deliberately chosen to affect behavioral and emotional responses in humans such as concentration, relaxation, distraction, and excitement. Listeners are uniquely subject to background music with no control over its volume and content. The range of responses created are of great variety, and even opposite, depending on numerous factors such as, setting, culture, audience, and even time of day.

Background music is commonly played where there is no audience at all, such as empty hallways and restrooms and fitting rooms. It is also used in artificial space, such as music played while on hold during a telephone call, and virtual space, as in the ambient sounds or thematic music in video games. It is typically played at low volumes from multiple small speakers distributing the music across broad public spaces. The widespread use of background music in offices, restaurants, and stores began with the founding of Muzak in the 1930s and was characterized by repetition and simple musical arrangements. Its use has grown worldwide and today incorporates the findings of psychological research relating to consumer behavior in retail environments, employee productivity, and workplace satisfaction.

Due to the growing variety of settings (from doctors offices to airports), many styles of music are utilized as background music. Because the aim of background music is passive listening, vocals, commercial interruptions, and complexity are typically avoided. In spite of the international distribution common to syndicated background music artists, it is often associated with artistic failure and a lack of musical talent in the entertainment industry. There are composers who write specifically for music syndication services such as Dynamic Media and Mood Media, successors of Muzak, and MTI Digital. Multiple studies have correlated the presence of background music with increased spending in retail establishments.

Types

Incidental music

Incidental music is music in a play, radio/TV program or some other form that is not primarily musical. It seeks to add atmosphere to the action and evoke or reinforce emotions being portrayed. It can be dated back at least as far as Greek drama. A number of classical composers have written incidental music for various plays. It can range from simple drum sequences or bass notes to complex orchestral arrangements.

Furniture music

The term furniture music was coined by Erik Satie in 1917. It fell into disuse when the composer died a few years later, and the genre was revived several decades later. Typical of furniture music are short musical passages, with an indefinite number of repeats.

Muzak / Elevator music

Elevator music (also known as Muzak, piped music, or lift music) is a more general term indicating music that is played in rooms where many people come together (that is, not for the explicit purpose of listening to music), and during telephone calls when placed on hold. There is a specific sound associated with elevator music, but it usually involves simple instrumental themes from "soft" popular music, or "light" classical music being performed by slow strings. More recent types of elevator music may be computer-generated, with the actual score being composed entirely algorithmically.

The term can also be used for kinds of easy listening, piano solo, jazz or middle of the road music, or what are known as "beautiful music" radio stations.

Video game music
Video game music (VGM) is a soundtrack for video games. Songs may be original and composed specifically for the game, or preexisting music licensed for use in the game. Music in video games can be heard over a game's title screen, menus and during gameplay.

Website music
The early social media website Myspace has supported a feature where specific songs chosen by the user would automatically play on their profile pages.

Group fitness music 
With the proliferation of boutique fitness classes in the late 2010s, a new emphasis is being placed on properly licensing music to be used by instructors in a group fitness environment. As it is more interactive than traditional background music, the licensing and cost structures differ.

Internet delivered background music 
Internet-delivered background music was delivered by companies as Mood Media (which had acquired Trusonic, which had acquired Muzak). This allowed the retailer to instantly update music and messages which were deployed at the store level as opposed to using older compact disc and satellite technologies.

Background non-music

Business audio
Business audio refers to a type of service that provides audio content that is licensed for use in a commercial setting.

Business news can be one example. The term background music is another example. Providers of the latter include:
 Cloud Cover Media, Inc.
 StoreStreams Inc
 Muzak Holdings LLC
 DMX
 PlayNetwork
 XM for Business
 Music Choice
 CUSTOMtronics Sound
 Applied Media Technologies Corporation
 Trusonic
 Couture Media, Inc.

In the United States, the terms "elevator music" and "Muzak" are commonly used to refer to business audio services that provide background music in retail settings.

History
Founded in 1934, Muzak was among the early background music providers.

Business audio is produced off-site and delivered to the client via a number of methods including DBS satellite, SDARS satellite, coaxial cable, FM radio subcarrier, leased line, internet broadband, compact disc, and tape.

Most audio content is licensed for personal and home use only. Business audio services allow clients to use audio content in public and commercial settings by paying appropriate royalties to performing rights organizations like ASCAP, BMI, SESAC and GEMA in Germany.

Historical devices
 The 1959 Seeburg 1000 was a stack record player, playing both sides continuous and repeating up to 1000 songs and up to 25 special 9" vinyl records with a 2" center bore at 16⅔ RPM.
 The Rowe Customusic was an endless tape cartridge player, loading simultaneous six C-type Fidelipac cartridges. 
 The 1964 3M Cantata 700 played continuous and auto-reversing one of its large and proprietary magnetic tape cartridges, containing up to 26 hours of music.

See also
 Ambient music
 Applied Media Technologies Corporation
 DMX
 PlayNetwork
 Jamendo

References

Music cognition
Music psychology
Cognitive musicology
Easy listening music
Industrial music services
Music in advertising
Broadcasting